The 1981–82 South Pacific cyclone season was a slightly-below average South Pacific tropical cyclone season, with 6 tropical cyclones occurring within the South Pacific Ocean basin between 160°E and 120°W during the season. After this season, the names Gyan and Isaac were retired from the lists of names, after they caused significant impacts to South Pacific island nations.

During the season, tropical cyclones were monitored by the Tropical Cyclone Warning Centers in Nadi, Fiji, Brisbane, Australia and Wellington, New Zealand. During the season TCWC Nadi issued warnings and assigned names to any tropical cyclones that developed between the Equator and 25°S while TCWC Wellington issued warnings for any that were located to the south of 25°S. The United States Armed Forces through the Joint Typhoon Warning Center (JTWC) and Naval Pacific Meteorology and Oceanography Center (NPMOC), also monitored the basin and issued unofficial warnings for American interests. TCWC Nadi, Brisbane and Wellington measured sustained windspeeds over a 10-minute which are compared to the modern day Australian tropical cyclone intensity scale. The JTWC and the NPMOC measured sustained windspeeds over a 1-minute period which are compared to the Saffir-Simpson Hurricane Scale (SSHS).



Systems

Severe Tropical Cyclone Gyan

Severe Tropical Cyclone Gyan existed from December 18 to December 29.

Severe Tropical Cyclone Hettie

Severe Tropical Cyclone Hettie existed from January 24 to February 1.

Severe Tropical Cyclone Abigail

Severe Tropical Cyclone Abigail existed from February 1 to February 7.

Severe Tropical Cyclone Isaac

The tropical cyclone developed 160 km/100 mi northeast of western Samoa and travelled southwest at 12 knots, moving through the Ha'apai island group and only 50 km/30 mi northwest of Tongatapu. Isaac reached maximum intensity on March 2. The tropical cyclone was the worst storm in Tonga's history, devastating the island group. The island groups of Ha'apai and Vava'u were hit worst. Six were killed, while 45,000 became homeless and 95% of the livestock was killed.

Severe Tropical Cyclone Bernie

Severe Tropical Cyclone Bernie existed from April 1 to April 9.

Bernie caused extensive damage to natural vegetation and food gardens on the islands of Western Gudalcanal, Santa Isabel, New Georgia and the Russell Islands. Over 1000 people also had to evacuated from villages on the eastern coast of Gudalcanal.

Tropical Cyclone Claudia

Tropical Cyclone Claudia existed from May 13 to May 18.

Other systems
Between February 4 - 5, a developing tropical cyclone existed to the west of the Samoan Islands and caused flooding, as well as widespread wind damage within American Samoa. Significant damage was also reported in Western Samoa.

See also

Atlantic hurricane seasons: 1981, 1982
Eastern Pacific hurricane seasons: 1981, 1982
Western Pacific typhoon seasons: 1981, 1982
North Indian Ocean cyclone seasons: 1981, 1982

References

External links

 
South Pacific cyclone seasons
Tropical cyclones in 1981